Former Residence of Mao Zedong or Mao Zedong's Former Residence was built in the late Qing dynasty (1644–1911). It is located in Shaoshan Village of Shaoshan Township in Shaoshan, Xiangtan, Hunan, China. The building was the birthplace and childhood home of Mao Zedong, the first leader of the People's Republic of China.

History

In 1893, Mao Zedong was born here, and he lived here about 17 years before leaving for his studies.  He returned home in 1912 to mobilize his relatives to join the revolution, and he again returned home in 1925 and 1927.  Having led the Peasant Movement in Guangzhou, he sought to start a similar movement in Hunan.  The house was destroyed by the government in 1929, but in 1950, the newly triumphant Communist government rebuilt the house, and it was visited by Mao's oldest son Mao Anying in May 1950.  Mao again returned in 1959, eight years after the new house had been opened as a museum, and five years after it had officially been renamed Mao Zedong's Former Residence.

In 1961, it was listed as a "Major Historical and Cultural Site Protected at the National Level" by the State Council of China.

In 1966, in the Cultural Revolution, the number of tourists was inflated. The site was open at all times of the day or night.

On June 27, 1983, Central Advisory Commission chairman Deng Xiaoping wrote "Mao Zedong's Former Residence" on the horizontal tablet.

On December 20, 1993, the Communist Party general secretary Jiang Zemin attended the unveiling of the statue of Mao Zedong outside the house.

In July 1997, it was listed as a National Patriotic Education Base by the Propaganda Department of the Communist Party of China.

In December 2004, it was closed for rebuilding and repairs.

References

Major National Historical and Cultural Sites in Hunan
Traditional folk houses in Hunan
Buildings and structures in Xiangtan
Tourist attractions in Xiangtan
Shaoshan
Mao Zedong